Pterolophiella olivicollis is a species of beetle in the family Cerambycidae, and the only species in the genus Pterolophiella. It was described by Stephan von Breuning in 1952.

References

Lamiinae
Beetles described in 1952
Taxa named by Stephan von Breuning (entomologist)